2022 WDF season of darts comprises every tournament of World Darts Federation. The prize money of the tournaments may vary depending on category.

Two of WDF's most prestigious events are due to be held in 2022, WDF World Darts Championship (to be held in April'22), WDF World Masters (to be held in December'22)

2022 is the second year in darts under WDF-sole management after the demise of BDO in 2020.

Tournament categories, points & prize money

Calendar

January

February

March

April

May

June

July

August

September

October

November

December

Tournaments cancelled
Following tournaments have been cancelled or postponed until 2023.

Statistical information

The players/nations are sorted by:
 Total number of titles;
 Cumulated importance of those titles;
 Alphabetical order (by family names for players).

Titles won by player (men's)

Titles won by nation (men's)

Titles won by player (women's)

Titles won by nation (women's)

Rankings
Only the best ten points achievements by players in WDF Ranked Tournaments accounts towards the WDF Rankings

Updated to September 5, 2022

Men's

Women's

References

External links
2022 WDF calendar

2022 in darts